The Mount Tai earthquake was the first recorded earthquake in history.  It occurred at Mount Tai, in present-day Shandong province, China, during the seventh year of the reign of King Fa of the Xia dynasty, which places its occurrence at some point between circa 2205 and 1600 BCE. The earthquake was mentioned briefly in the Bamboo Annals. The event has tentatively been dated to 1831 or 1740 BCE.

See also
 Mandate of Heaven

Notes

References

Xia dynasty
Earthquakes in China
19th century BC
Ancient natural disasters